Tsjibbe Gearts van der Meulen (May 6, 1824 – March 16, 1906) was a West Frisian-language writer and poet from the town of Burgum in the Dutch province of Friesland. He was also a clock-maker, book seller, printer and publisher.

Most of his work is collected in Ald en nij (Old and new), a work of almost 700 pages, published  after his death (in 1908) by his son Wigger Arnoldus. In 1974 an anthology of his autobiographical stories called In brulloft yn'e Wâlden en oare wiere forhalen (A wedding in the Woods and other true stories) was published.

References
H. van der Vliet, Burgum Wâld- en Wetterdoarp, op ‘e nij besjoen en beskreaun, Burgum, Doarpsbelangen Burgum, 1993. .

1824 births
1906 deaths
West Frisian-language writers
People from Tytsjerksteradiel